{{DISPLAYTITLE:C21H25ClN2O3}}
The molecular formula C21H25ClN2O3 (molar mass: 388.89 g/mol) may refer to:

 Bepotastine
 Cetirizine (brand name Zyrtec)
 Levocetirizine (brand name Xyzal)